The 2020 season was Sarawak United's 1st year in their history and also first season in the Malaysia Premier League following rebranding from Selangor United FC. Along with the league, the club also participated in the Malaysia FA Cup but was cancelled due to COVID-19 pandemic.

Events
On 23 January 2020, Amri Yahyah signed with the club.

Players

Competitions

Malaysia Premier League

League table

Statistics

Appearances and goals

|-
|}

References

Sarawak United FC seasons
Sarawak United